Diego Markic (born 9 January 1977 in Argentina) is an Argentinean retired footballer currently assistant coach of the United Arab Emirates national football team.

References

Association football midfielders
Living people
1977 births
Argentine footballers
Argentine people of Croatian descent
Argentinos Juniors footballers
S.S.C. Bari players
Club Atlético Colón footballers
Quilmes Atlético Club footballers